The Benny Goodman Treasure Chest  is a jazz album by Benny Goodman, released in 1959.  This three-LP Record Box Set was released by MGM Records These are Performance Recordings 1937–1938 by the original orchestra, trio, and quartet featuring Benny Goodman (clarinet) with Harry James/Ziggy Elman/Chris Griffin (trumpet), Murray McEachern/Red Ballard/Vernon Brown (trombone), Lionel Hampton (vibes), Teddy Wilson/Jess Stacy (piano), Hymie Shertzer/Vido Musso/Jerry Jerome/George Koenig/Dave Matthews/Arthur Rollini/Babe Russin (sax), Harry Goodman/Artie Bernstein (bass), Charlie Christian/Allan Reuss (guitar) and Gene Krupa/Dave Tough/Nick Fatool (drums).

Track listing
 "Camel Hop"
 "Handful of Keys"
 "AC/DC Current"
 "Smiles"
 "So Rare"
 "Alexander's Ragtime Band"
 "I've Got My Love to Keep Me Warm"
 "Twilight in Turkey"
 "Remember"
 "Some of These Days"
 "Sleepy Time Down South"
 "Chloe"
 "Hallelujah"
 "Marie"
 "Avalon
 "If Dreams Come True"
 "Nobody's Sweetheart Now"
 "I Got Rhythm"
 "Big John's Special"
 "Remember Me"
 "Bach Goes to Town"
 "Limehouse Blues"
 "Space Man"
 "Honeysuckle Rose"
 "Swing Low, Sweet Chariot"
 "Dear Old Southland"
 "When Buddha Smiles"
 "Diga Diga Do"
 "Whispers in the Dark"
 "Madhouse"
 "Three Little Words"
 "I Surrender, Dear"
 "Chicago"
 "Tea for Two"
 "Can't We Be Friends"
 "I Know That You Know"

References

1959 albums
Benny Goodman albums